Franca Anna Bianconi Manni (born 3 March 1962) is an Italian figure skating coach and former competitor. She competed at the 1980 Winter Olympics, but did not medal.

Personal life 
Bianconi was born on 3 March 1962 in Milan, Italy. She is the mother of Italian ice dancer Victoria Manni.

Career 
Bianconi began skating at age six in Milan. During her career, she was coached mainly by Franca Invernizzi in Milan and also spent time in Colorado training under Carlo Fassi and in Lake Placid under Tommy Litz.

Bianconi debuted at the European and World Championships in 1977. She was selected to represent Italy at the 1980 Winter Olympics in Lake Placid, New York and finished 19th. She retired from competition in 1981 and became a coach.

Bianconi's earliest students were Paola Tosi, the 1985 Italian champion, and Antonio Moffa, the 1987 Italian silver medalist. She has also coached Valentina Marchei, Roberta Rodeghiero, Stefania Berton / Ondřej Hotárek (the 2013 European bronze medalists), and Matteo Rizzo (from the age of six years). She is based at S.S.D. S.r.l. Icelab in Bergamo.

Competitive highlights

References 

1962 births
Italian female single skaters
Italian figure skating coaches
Living people
Figure skaters at the 1980 Winter Olympics
Olympic figure skaters of Italy
Figure skaters from Milan
Female sports coaches